Saint Matthew Passion is a 1966 Hungarian short documentary film directed by Tamás Czigány. It was nominated for an Academy Award for Best Documentary Short.

References

External links

1966 films
1966 documentary films
1966 short films
1960s Hungarian-language films
Hungarian short documentary films
1960s short documentary films